Quirino Longo (died 1502) was a Roman Catholic prelate who served as Bishop of Lavello (1498–1502).

Biography
In July 1498, Quirino Longo was appointed by Pope Alexander VI as Bishop of Lavello.
He served as Bishop of Lavello until his death in 1502.

See also 
Catholic Church in Italy

References

External links and additional sources
 (Chronology of Bishops) 
 (Chronology of Bishops) 

15th-century Italian Roman Catholic bishops
1502 deaths
Bishops appointed by Pope Alexander VI